Cassa di Risparmio di Cuneo S.p.A. was an Italian savings bank based in Cuneo, Piedmont. The organization ceased to operate as a bank but as a non-profit organization as Fondazione Cassa di Risparmio di Cuneo.

History
Cassa di Risparmio di Cuneo was founded in 1855. Due to 1991 bank reform, two entity, namely Cassa di Risparmio di Cuneo S.p.A. and Fondazione Cassa di Risparmio di Cuneo were formed. On 1 January 1995 the S.p.A. merged with Banca del Monte di Lombardia S.p.A. to form Banca Regionale Europea (a subsidiary of Banca Lombarda e Piemontese since 2000 and UBI Banca since 2007. )

Banking foundation
As of 31 December 2014, the foundation held 24.90% of Banca Regionale Europea as well as 2.230% of UBI Banca.

The foundation sponsored the restoration of Alba Cathedral.

See also

Other banks of the provincial capital of Piedmont
 Cassa di Risparmio di Asti, independent bank, with Banca Popolare di Milano as minority owner
 Cassa di Risparmio di Alessandria, now part of Banca Popolare di Milano
 Cassa di Risparmio di Torino, now part of UniCredit

Saving banks of the Province of Cuneo:
 Banca Cassa di Risparmio di Savigliano, partially owned by Banca Popolare dell'Emilia Romagna
 Cassa di Risparmio di Bra, a Banca Popolare dell'Emilia Romagna subsidiary 
 Cassa di Risparmio di Fossano, partially owned by Banca Popolare dell'Emilia Romagna
 Cassa di Risparmio di Saluzzo, partially owned by Banca Popolare dell'Emilia Romagna

References

External links
 Fondazione Cassa di Risparmio di Cuneo

Banks established in 1855
Italian companies established in 1855
Banks disestablished in 1995
Italian companies disestablished in 1995
Defunct banks of Italy
Companies based in Piedmont
Cuneo
History of UBI Banca